Saphan Khwai is intersection and neighbourhood on overlapped area of Phaya Thai and Sam Sen Nai Subdistricts, Phaya Thai District, Bangkok, Thailand. 

The surrounding neighbourhood is studded with many apartments and is best known for its many shops and markets. It is served by the BTS skytrain service at Saphan Khwai Station. From the 1960s, as the urban zone of Bangkok grew, the land which once had been countryside, mostly rice farms, became urbanized with more residential and commercial areas.

Location 
In the northern zone of Bangkok's central business district at the junction of Phahon Yothin, Pradiphat, Sutthisan Vinitchai, and the short link of Saliratthawiphak Road. It is on the route of the Skytrain Sukhumvit Line between Ari and Mo Chit Stations

History 
"Khwai" or water buffaloes were commonly used for ploughing by Southeast Asian farmers including Thais. In the past, Saphan Khwai was a farming area on the northern outskirts of Bangkok's core, next to the northern part of Phaya Thai District. It was irrigated by Khlong Sam Sen and Khlong Bang Sue, diverted from the Chao Phraya River. At the beginning of the 19th century, the Saphan Khwai Intersection was the meeting place for rice farmers, buffalo traders, and slaughterhouse workers. Roads at the junction, did not meet directly, but a small waterway along Phahonyothin Road carrying irrigation water from Khlong Bang Sue crosses Pradiphat Way. For the convenience of traders a bridge or "saphan" was built. It was upgraded from wood to concrete as traffic increased.

Until the early 1960s, according to a local elderly woman, Saphan Khwai was still forested and filled with vegetable gardens. Every night around 8.00 p.m., herds of bulls pass through the bridge.

Today, although the fields and buffaloes with bulls have disappeared, the name "Saphan Khwai" is still used for this area. It means 'buffalo bridge'.

Transportation 
 BTS Skytrain: Saphan Khwai Station
 BMTA bus: route 3, 8, 26, 27, 28, 29, 34, 38, 39, 44, 52, 54, 59, 63, 74, 77, 90, 97, 108, 117, 157 (air cond.) 177, 204, 503, 509, 510, 524

References 

Neighbourhoods of Bangkok
Phaya Thai district
Road junctions in Bangkok